Hans-Georg von der Marwitz (7 August 1893 – 12 May 1925) was a German World War I flying ace credited with 15 aerial victories.

Early life and ground service
Hans-Georg von der Marwitz was born at Ohlau, Silesia on 7 August 1893. He was born to nobility, his father being General of Cavalry Georg von der Marwitz, commander of Germany's Second Army. The younger Marwitz began his career as a cavalryman in Uhlan Regiment No. 16. By 1915, he was in the infantry, successively in Infanterie Regiment No. 13 and Infanterie Regiment No. 16.

Aviation service

Marwitz transferred to aviation in March 1916 and became a pilot flying a bomber for Kampfgeschwader 5. After a transfer Marwitz scored his first victory while flying for Schutzstaffel 10, on 5 January 1917. A year later, he trained as a fighter pilot; upon completion of training, on 18 April 1917, he was assigned to Royal Prussian Jagdstaffel 30 under the command of Hans Bethge. He scored his second time that year, when he used his Pfalz D.III fighter to burn an observation balloon on 13 May.

Marwitz would not score again until 19 February 1918; he then tallied a victory of two per month for the remainder of the war. Marwitz commanded Jagdstaffel 30 for two months, from 17 April to 17 June 1918 As Staffelfuhrer, he flew a Pfalz painted all burgundy except for a white rudder and a large orange diamond emblazoned on either side of its cockpit. He was wounded on 17 June. He would fly a Pfalz until July 1918, when Jasta 30 upgraded to Fokker D.VIIs.

Postwar
Marwitz survived the war, only to die in an airplane crash.

Notes

References

 Norman Franks, Frank W. Bailey, Russell Guest (1993). Above the Lines: The Aces and Fighter Units of the German Air Service, Naval Air Service and Flanders Marine Corps, 1914–1918. Grub Street. , 
 
 
 

1893 births
1925 deaths
People from Oława
People from the Province of Silesia
German World War I flying aces
Hans-Georg
Prussian Army personnel
Luftstreitkräfte personnel
Aviators killed in aviation accidents or incidents in Germany
21st-century German politicians